Shaping can refer to:

 In baking, shaping refers to the process step directly preceding proofing or final fermentation.
 In electricity generation, maintaining reliable delivery, for example by use of pumped storage hydroelectricity.
 In archeology, the shaping (archeology) is the process of giving a stone a desired shape.
 In psychology, shaping (psychology), is the reinforcement of successive approximations to train a type of behavior.
 In communications, Traffic shaping, is the internet traffic management.
 In mechanics, shaping is a material removal process in which a cutting tool takes mass and shapes a stationary object to produce a sculpted or plane surface.
 Gear shaper, the shaping process used specifically for gear manufacturing.
 Shaping (audio), modifications both additive and subtractive that alter the final timbre of the initial audio wave whether this is produced as an acoustic sound wave or an electric signal.

Chinese places

Towns
 Shaping, Dianjiang County (沙坪镇), town in Dianjiang County, Chongqing
 Shaping, Lechang (沙坪镇), town in Guangdong
 Shaping, Lingshan County (沙坪镇), town in Lingshan County, Guangxi
 Shaping, Taoyuan (沙坪镇), town in Taoyuan County, Hunan.
subdistrict
 Shaping, Changsha (沙坪街道), a subdistrict of Kaifu District, Changsha.

Villages
 Shaping Village, Dali (沙坪村), a village of Shangguan town (上关镇) in Dali City, Yunnan.
 Shaping Village, Daguan (沙坪村), a village of Ruile town (悦乐镇) in Daguan County, Yunnan.